The eyelid pull is a gesture in which the finger is used to pull one lower eyelid further down, exposing more of the eyeball. This gesture has different meanings in different cultures, but in many cultures, particularly in the Mediterranean, signifies alertness, or a warning to be watchful.
In the Italian language, one can say occhio (eye), not necessarily with the gesture, to signify the same.

In France, the gesture of pulling down one's lower eyelid and saying mon œil, or "my eye", is an expression of disdainful, dismissive disbelief. In Turkey it is used similarly. The phrase "my eye" is an outdated expression of disbelief in the English language, although without the gesture.

See also 
 Akanbe

References

Gestures
Human eye